Otter Lake is located in Tulameen, British Columbia about  north-east of Princeton and  east of Vancouver. It is a popular destination for swimming, water-skiing, fishing and camping.

External links 

 Tulameen, BC
 BC Geographical names

Lakes of British Columbia
Yale Division Yale Land District